Loyal Valley is an unincorporated farming and ranching community, established in 1858, and is  north of Cherry Spring in the southeastern corner of Mason County, in the U.S. state of Texas. The community is located on the old Pinta Trail.

The year 2000 population was 50. Elevation .

Settlers and Community
Loyal Valley was settled in 1858 by German immigrants from Fredericksburg, including Henry and Christian Keyser, John Kidd, and a Mr. Gertsdorff (most likely Von Gersdorff or Gersdorff, as it was spelled in that era). It was also a stagecoach stop on the route between San Antonio and the western forts.

The community received a post office in 1868, and Solomon Wright was the first postmaster. 

John O. Meusebach moved to Loyal Valley after the New Braunfels tornado of September 12, 1869 destroyed his home there.  According to Meusebach's granddaughter Irene Marschall King, he named the area for his personal loyalty to the Union that he had maintained during the American Civil War.  He operated a general store and stage stop.  Meusebach was appointed justice of the peace, notary public and served as the community's second postmaster in 1873. His daughter Lucy Meusebach Marschall was postmaster in January 1887, and his wife Agnes became postmaster in August 1887.

The Meusebach-Comanche Treaty was brokered in with the Penateka Comanche Tribe 1847, making area settlers safe from Penataka raids.  However, Kiowa, Apache and other Comanche tribes still committed depredations against the settlers. During the 1870s, settlers from neighboring communities relocated to Loyal Valley for safety. Herman Lehmann, son of Augusta and Moritz Lehmann, became the most famous captive of the Apache depredations. He escaped the Apache, to be later rescued by the Comanche and adopted by chief Quanah Parker. Philip Buchmeyer (or Buchmeier) was the second husband of the widowed Augusta Lehmann, and stepfather to her sons Herman and Willie. The Buchmeyers ran a hotel and saloon, which later was owned by Charlie Metcalf. Philip Buchmeyer built a one-room stone structure school-church, which was still standing as of 1980.

Mason County Hoo Doo War 
In 1875, the Mason County Hoo Doo War erupted over cattle rustling and those who took the law into their own hands.  Armed bands raided settlements spreading fear and unrest.  John O. Meusebach was shot in the leg during a raid of his store. In the midst of the war, Loyal Valley home owner Tim Williamson was murdered by a dozen masked vigilantes who accused him of cattle theft. Williamson's adopted son Texas Ranger Scott Cooley sought revenge.  Cooley and his desperadoes, which included Johnny Ringo, created a reign of terror over the area. It was during this episode that Ringo committed his first murder, that of James Cheyney.

See also
 German Texan
 Texas Hill Country

References

External links
 Mason County Historic Preservation

Unincorporated communities in Mason County, Texas
Unincorporated communities in Texas
German-American history
German-American culture in Texas
Populated places established in 1858
1858 establishments in Texas